Angelique Morgan (born 22 September 1975), also known as Frenchy or Frenchy Morgan, is a French television personality and model. She is best known for her appearances on Howard TV (2007-2008), and the VH1's reality shows Rock of Love 2, Rock of Love: Charm School (both 2008), and I Love Money 2 (2009). In 2014, Morgan was a contestant on the fourteenth series of Celebrity Big Brother.

Career

2010–present
In 2011, Morgan appeared in two motion picture movies, She made her mainstream film debut in Stripped, a documentary that chronicles the making of photographer Greg Friedler's new book, Naked Las Vegas.

In 2011, she landed a regular hosting job on a radio show on BlogTalkRadio.com.

In September 2012, Friedler released the official trailer for his new book America Stripped: Naked, Las Vegas. Morgan made an appearance towards the end of the trailer, showing off her body and then cutting to a separate interview-style segment. The book's official website features photographs of Angelique with and without clothes on, under its "the book" section. Friedler's book shows the inside and outside of various people of Las Vegas, attempting to show the truth behind the people that reside there.

In August 2014, Morgan took part in the fourteenth series of Celebrity Big Brother. She entered the house on Day 1. She was nominated on Day 10, She survived this eviction on Day 12. On Day 14, she was nominated again, She was then evicted on Day 17. Since Celebrity Big Brother, Morgan has appeared on E! Botched and guest starred in MTV's Teen Mom.

Morgan has also released four songs and is currently working on her own reality TV show 'Frenchy World'.

Personal life
In 2004, Morgan moved to Las Vegas and began making appearances on Playboy TV. In 2018, Morgan starred in burlesque magic show Le Magique Fantastique, at Bally's Las Vegas Hotel & Casino.

After her second appearance on The Howard Stern Show, a casting producer for VH1 contacted Morgan, asking her to take part in Rock of Love 2, where she would make her first appearance on reality television. After Rock Of Love 2, VH1 asked Angelique to appear in three further reality TV series.

She dated Oli London, a British internet celebrity.

Filmography

Television

Movies

Hosting

TV Hosting

Radio Hosting

References

External links

Participants in American reality television series
Actresses from Paris
French expatriates in the United States
French pornographic film actresses
Living people
1975 births